Eloceria is a genus of flies in the family Tachinidae.

Species
E. delecta (Meigen, 1824)

References

Tachininae
Tachinidae genera
Taxa named by Jean-Baptiste Robineau-Desvoidy